Misal pav (Marathi: मिसळपाव) is a popular dish from the Indian state of Maharashtra. It consists of misal (a spicy curry usually made from moth beans) and pav (a type of Indian bread roll). The final dish is topped with farsan or sev, onions, lemon and coriander (cilantro). It is usually served hot with bread or rolls toasted with butter and buttermilk or dahi and papad. It is served as a breakfast dish, as a snack and also as a full meal.

Misal regional varieties
Misal pav from Kolhapur is known for its high spice content and unique taste. There are different versions of misal pav such as Pune misal, Khandeshi misal, Nashik misal and Ahmednagar misal. Other types are kalya masalyachi misal, shev misal, and dahi (yoghurt) misal.

Preparation
Misal is prepared in part with sprouted lentils and has less water content and a watery, spicy "cut" or "bite". It has two parts, a thick curry of matki, called usal, and watery gravy, also called rassa. Usually people mix these two according to their taste and requirement. When moth beans are unavailable, it is sometimes prepared using mung beans. It may be garnished with Indian snack noodles. The moth curry or usal form is prepared using onion, ginger, garlic and other spices.

Recognition
In 2015, the misal pav served at Dadar's Aaswad restaurant was named the world's tastiest vegetarian dish at the FoodieHub Awards in London.

Variants 
 The Nashik version of misal is usually spicy and served with pav, curd, papad, chopped coriander and onion. Several misal joints are popular in the city
 Puneri misal is another version which contains pohe. There are a number of restaurants in the city that are popular for their misal.

See also

 List of Indian dishes

Notes

References

Indian cuisine
Indian curries
Indian fast food
Maharashtrian cuisine